Suzhou River is a 2000 film by Lou Ye about a tragic love story set in contemporary Shanghai. The film, though stylistically distinct, is typical of "Sixth Generation" Chinese filmmakers in its subject matter of contemporary China's gritty urban experience. The film stars Zhou Xun in a dual role as two different women and Jia Hongsheng as a man obsessed with finding a woman from his past. The film was co-produced by the German Essential Films and China's Dream Factory.

Writer-director Lou Ye's second film, Suzhou River takes as its background the chaotically built-up riverside architecture of factory buildings and abandoned warehouses along the Suzhou River, rather than the glitzy new face of Shanghai.

Though well-received abroad, Suzhou River was not screened in its native China, as Lou Ye was banned from filmmaking for two years after screening his film at the International Film Festival Rotterdam without permission from Chinese authorities.

The movie is now authorized in China.

Plot
The story follows the transient lives of four people at the margins of Chinese society. An anonymous videographer (Hua Zhongkai) opens the film with a monologue on the eponymous Suzhou River and love. As the film's narrator, the videographer is nevertheless never seen aside from his hands, as the camera serves as his first-person perspective for the audience. He starts by telling the story of a romance between himself and Meimei (Zhou Xun), a performer at a dive bar in Shanghai. He discusses his love of Meimei, who makes a living putting on a blond wig and mermaid costume and swimming in a large water tank at the "Happy Tavern," and who disappears days at a time, leaving him heartbroken each time.

The videographer then begins relating the story of Mardar (Jia Hongsheng), a small-time crook and motorcycle courier, and Moudan (Zhou Xun), the daughter of a rich businessman, whom Mardar is hired to ferry around town whenever Moudan's father brings home one of his mistresses. During their brief encounters on his motorcycle, Mardar and Moudan fall in love. Unbeknownst to Moudan, however, Mardar has become involved in a kidnapping scheme with his former lover Xiao Hong (Nai An), and the criminal Lao B (Yao Anlian). Mardar is ordered by Xiao Hong and Lao B to take Moudan to an abandoned warehouse while they orchestrate a pickup of the ransom money. The kidnapping goes awry when Lao B betrays and murders Xiao Ho as soon as the money is in hand. Mardar, unaware of these developments, prepares to move the girl when she asks him how much her ransom was. Mardar answers 450,000 RMB. "Am I so cheap?" she screams and runs away. Mardar chases after her only to see her jump into the Suzhou River, apparently to her death. Mardar is then arrested and imprisoned. Moudan's body, however, is never found.

Years later, Mardar returns to Shanghai and resumes his work as a courier, all the while still looking for Moudan. One night, he happens upon the Happy Tavern where he meets Meimei, the videographer's elusive girlfriend. Mardar, convinced she's his lost love, first spies on her in her dressing room and then seeks out the videographer to tell his story. Later, Mardar tells Meimei herself about his affair with Moudan. Humoring him at first, she eventually becomes enamored with his story and takes him to bed. After being beaten one night by the owner of the Happy Tavern, Mardar heads out to the suburbs, where he discovers the real Moudan working in a convenience store. The film ends with the ambiguous death of both Mardar and Moudan, leaving the viewer to decide if it was an accident or suicide. The videographer and Meimei spend one more night together, before Meimei disappears again, leaving a note telling the videographer that if he truly loves her, as Mardar loved Moudan, he will find her. The videographer decides not to.

Cast
Jia Hongsheng as Mardar (马达 Mǎdá), a small-time crook and motorcycle courier. Jia had previously starred in Lou Ye's Weekend Lover.
Zhou Xun as Moudan (牡丹 Mǔdan)/Meimei (美美 Měiměi). The dual role for Zhou Xun required her to play both the demure and girlish Moudan, and the more aggressive but no less romantic Meimei.
Hua Zhongkai as the Videographer, Lao Li (老李 Lǎo Lǐ). The audience never sees Hua and only hears his voice as the film's primary narrator, with the camera serving as his subjective point of view. 
Nai An as Xiao Hong (萧红 Xiāo Hóng), Mardar's former lover and conspirator in the plot to kidnap Moudan for ransom. Nai An also served as one of Suzhou River's producers.
Yao Anlian as Boss/Lao B (酒吧老板 Jiǔbā Lǎobǎn "Bar Boss"), another conspirator. A throwaway reference in the film notes that he is killed off-camera during a police chase.

Influences
Upon Suzhou River's release, many Western critics saw the film as heavily influenced by a number of key sources. Several noted how the film's urban romanticism reflected the works of Hong Kong director Wong Kar-wai. Others found a similar connection to Wong but in cinematographer Wang Yu's use of the hand-held camera as being similar to Wong's Chungking Express.

Critics also saw the film as an homage to Alfred Hitchcock's tale of obsessive love, Vertigo. Suzhou River's thematic use of water (in this case the titular river) and its plot of men obsessed with a woman/women who may not be who she/they say they refer back to Hitchcock's earlier film. Even the film's score is said to echo Bernard Herrmann's classic soundtrack to Vertigo. Some critics also saw in Suzhou River elements of another Hitchcock classic, Rear Window, particularly in the character of the Videographer, the film's voyeuristic narrator.

Chinese film scholar Shelly Kraicer saw the film as an homage to the writer Wang Shuo, the so-called "bad boy" of Chinese literature, particularly in the film's noir-like characters on the margins of society, and the playing with genre conventions.

Reception
Many critics felt the release of Suzhou River in the international film festival circuit announced a major new voice in the sixth generation movement. One critic stated that the film's take on film noir and urban life in Shanghai could potentially breathe new life into the movement. Other western critics were captivated by the film's atmosphere and its echoes of other directors like Alfred Hitchcock and Wong Kar-wai.  The British Film Institute named Suzhou River as its "movie of the month" for December 2000, writing that, "[i]n the end, it's hard not to be swept up by the strong current of Suzhou River: a seductive and atmospheric conundrum that works pleasingly as an exercise in storytelling." Other critics wrote similar praises but found the plot somewhat lacking.  Critic J. Hoberman praised the film's style: "Shot with a jostling, nervous camera, Suzhou River looks great—the showy jump cuts and off-kilter close-ups belie an extremely well edited, even supple, piece of work." At the same time, however, he wrote that "Suzhou River's narrative is more than a bit cornball and not overly convincing—which is to say the movie's conviction is to be found in its formal values." A similar review came from The New York Times A. O. Scott, who found the film emotionally distant. Even Scott, however, could not deny the allure of the film's atmospherics, describing the film as providing "impeccable attitude and captivating atmosphere."

Review aggregator Rotten Tomatoes records that 89% (25 out of 28 reviews) for Suzhou River were positive in content, while Metacritic gave a score of 76 (out of 100, based on 18 reviews), indicating "generally favorable reviews."

Awards and nominations
Belgian Syndicate of Cinema Critics, 2001
Grand Prix (nominated)
International Film Festival Rotterdam, 2000
Tiger Award
Viennale, 2000
FIPRESCI Award, "for its realistic and documentary approach to thriller conventions, and its expressive use of narrative and cinematic structure".
Paris Film Festival, 2000
Grand Prix
Best Actress - Zhou Xun
Fantasporto, 2002
Critics' Award

ReferencesWorks cited'
Silbergeld, Jerome (2004). Hitchcock With a Chinese Face: Cinematic Doubles, Oedipal Triangles, and China's Moral Voice. Seattle and London: University of Washington Press.

External links

 
 
 
 
 Suzhou River at the Chinese Movie Database

2000 films
2000 romantic drama films
Chinese romantic drama films
2000s Mandarin-language films
Chinese neo-noir films
Films shot from the first-person perspective
Films set in Shanghai
Films shot in Shanghai
Films directed by Lou Ye
2000s Chinese films